The 1915 Chicago Whales season was a season in American baseball. After not having an official nickname in 1914, the team officially became the Whales for the 1915 season. They finished the season with an 86–66 record, placing them in a statistical tie with the St. Louis Terriers for first place in the Federal League. However, since the Whales had a slightly better winning percentage, they were declared the league champions.

Regular season

Season standings

Record vs. opponents

Roster

Player stats

Batting

Starters by position 
Note: Pos = Position; G = Games played; AB = At bats; H = Hits; Avg. = Batting average; HR = Home runs; RBI = Runs batted in

Other batters 
Note: G = Games played; AB = At bats; H = Hits; Avg. = Batting average; HR = Home runs; RBI = Runs batted in

Pitching

Starting pitchers 
Note: G = Games pitched; IP = Innings pitched; W = Wins; L = Losses; ERA = Earned run average; SO = Strikeouts

Other pitchers 
Note: G = Games pitched; IP = Innings pitched; W = Wins; L = Losses; ERA = Earned run average; SO = Strikeouts

Relief pitchers 
Note: G = Games pitched; W = Wins; L = Losses; SV = Saves; ERA = Earned run average; SO = Strikeouts

References 
1915 Chicago Whales at Baseball Reference

Chicago Whales season